Hunter Drew (born October 21, 1998) is a Canadian professional ice hockey player currently playing for the Rockford IceHogs in the American Hockey League (AHL) as a prospect to the Chicago Blackhawks of the National Hockey League (NHL). He was selected by the Anaheim Ducks, 178th overall, by the in the 2018 NHL Entry Draft.

Playing career 
Drew played major junior hockey with the Charlottetown Islanders in the Quebec Major Junior Hockey League (QMJHL) from 2016–2019 and was selected by the Anaheim Ducks in the sixth-round, 178th overall, in the 2018 NHL Entry Draft. 

As a defenceman, Drew posted 50 points through 61 regular season games during his final season with the Islanders in 2018–19, earning a one-year contract with the Ducks AHL affiliate, the San Diego Gulls on August 14, 2019.

In his first professional season in 2019–20, Drew split the season between the Gulls and secondary affiliate, the Tulsa Oilers of the ECHL. He posted 2 goals and 7 points in 29 regular season games with the Gulls before the season was halted due to the COVID-19 pandemic. He was signed to a three-year, entry-level contract with the Anaheim Ducks on March 31, 2020. 

With the ongoing pandemic delaying the commencement of the 2020–21 season, Drew opted to continue his development in Europe by signing on loan with Slovakian club, HC '05 Banská Bystrica, on September 14, 2020. He collected 9 goals and 16 points through 20 games before returning to North America for the Ducks training camp and re-assignment to the San Diego Gulls. With the introduction of a taxi squad stretching the Gulls roster, Drew split the shortened season on the blueline and spot filling as a forward.

The positional switch came with instant success, as he responded in showing an offensive touch with the Gulls in finishing second amongst team forwards in scoring with 17 goals and 38 points in 64 regular season games. He was rewarded with his first recall to the Anaheim Ducks at the tail end of the season and made his NHL debut against the San Jose Sharks, and recorded his first NHL fight against Jonah Gadjovich in a 5-2 victory on April 26, 2022. Drew went scoreless with the Ducks over their final two regular season games. 

During the 2022–23 season, having played exclusively with the Gulls in posting just 11 points through 44 regular season games, Drew was traded by the Ducks to the Chicago Blackhawks in exchange for Josiah Slavin on February 23, 2023.

Career statistics

References

External links
 

1998 births
Living people
Anaheim Ducks draft picks
Anaheim Ducks players
HC '05 Banská Bystrica players
Charlottetown Islanders players
Canadian ice hockey forwards
Ice hockey people from Ontario
Rockford IceHogs (AHL) players
San Diego Gulls (AHL) players
Sportspeople from Kingston, Ontario
Tulsa Oilers (1992–present) players
Canadian expatriate ice hockey players in the United States
Canadian expatriate ice hockey players in Slovakia